Khvorasgan (also Romanized as Khvorāsgān; also known as Khavrāskān, Khorasqān, Khorasgun, and Khurāsqān) was a city in esfahan , then a city, in the Central District of Isfahan County, Isfahan Province, Iran. In 2013 the city was incorporated in Isfahan as its Municipal District 15 At the 2006 census, its population was 86,063, in 23,381 families.

References

External links

Populated places in Isfahan County

Cities in Isfahan Province